This is a list of mining accidents in the historic county of Lancashire at which five or more people were killed. Mining deaths have occurred wherever coal has been mined across the Lancashire Coalfield. The earliest deaths were recorded in parish registers. Ffrancis Taylior was buried at the Collegiate Church in Manchester after a fall in the "coale pitte" in 1622 and in 1661 or 1662, Thomas Hilton was "slain" at Bradford coal pit as was Thos Greene in 1664. Coal pit related deaths appear in the registers of Wigan Parish Church from the 1670s. In 1779 three "Poor Coaliers" were reported as being injured when the roof collapsed in a coal pit at Alkrington so that "their lives were dispared of..."

When the coal industry developed rapidly in the 19th century, labour and life were cheap. Men, women and children perished in explosions, roof falls, floods and haulage accidents. The Lancashire Coalfield, the seventh largest producer of coal in the 1870s, often had the highest accident figures. William Pickard, the miners' agent, championed the formation of the Lancashire and Cheshire Miners' Permanent Relief Society in 1872 after a spate of disasters that caused great distress and hardship, leaving widows and families destitute.

Most fatalities were caused by firedamp, some caused by the miners who took the tops off the safety lamps that were designed to protect them because of the poor light they gave out. Some mineowners turned a blind eye to the use of candles in even the gassiest coal seams.

To regulate working conditions, the government passed Acts of Parliament: the 1842 Act prohibited the employment of females and boys under 10 years old  and appointed a single inspector, but inspections were few and breaches were common. Acts passed in subsequent years led to the appointment of more inspectors and increased their powers to regulate how mines were operated and the working conditions and welfare of the miners.

After disasters the first rescuers were colliery managers and volunteer colleagues who descended into the pits to look for signs of life, rescue the injured, seal off underground fires and recover bodies while working in dangerous conditions sometimes at great cost to themselves. Apart from safety lamps to detect gases, they had no special equipment. They were the predecessors of the mines rescue teams. Mines rescue stations were recommended in a Royal Commission in 1886 but were not compulsory until after the Coal Mines Act 1911 was passed. In 1906 a committee of the Lancashire and Cheshire Coal Owners Association decided to provide a mines rescue station at Howe Bridge. Its trained rescuers were present at the Maypole and Pretoria Pit disasters. They also trained teams of men in pits throughout the coalfield. Boothstown Mines Rescue Station opened in November 1933 close to the East Lancashire Road. It replaced  stations at Howe Bridge, Denton, St Helens and Burnley.

1830s

1840s

1850s

1860s

1870s

1880s

1890s

1900s

1910s

1920s

1930s

1950s

1960s

1970s

See also
Glossary of coal mining terminology

References

Citations

Bibliography

 

Mining in Lancashire
Coal mining disasters in England
Lancashire